Sarafand or Sarafend may refer to:

Places
 Sarafand, Lebanon, also spelled Sarafend
 Sarepta, an ancient Phoenician city at the location of the modern Lebanese town
 Tzrifin, area in central Israel previously known as "Sarafand" or "Sarafend", which used to contain two namesake Palestinian villages:
 Sarafand al-Amar, 1920s–1940s site of Sarafand/Sarafend, the largest British military base in the Middle East 
 Sarafand al-Kharab
 Al-Sarafand, a Palestinian village near Haifa

Other uses
 Short Sarafand, a British 1930s biplane flying boat
 West Nile virus: the Sarafend strain, one of its deadly strains